Lau Nim Yat (born 4 December 1989) is a former Hong Kongese professional football player who played as a full-back.

Honours
Hong Kong
2009 East Asian Games: Gold medal

Career statistics

Club
As of 11 September 2009

International

Hong Kong U-23
As of 19 June 2011

Hong Kong
As of 16 October 2012

References

External links
Lau Nim Yat at HKFA

1989 births
Living people
Association football defenders
Hong Kong First Division League players
Hong Kong Premier League players
Hong Kong footballers
Eastern Sports Club footballers
TSW Pegasus FC players
South China AA players
Hong Kong Rangers FC players
Hong Kong international footballers